Dohertyorsidis is a genus of longhorn beetles of the subfamily Lamiinae, containing the following species:

 Dohertyorsidis dohertyi (Breuning, 1960)
 Dohertyorsidis indicus Breuning, 1982

References

Lamiini